Hans Schack, Count of Schackenborg (14 January 1734 – 21 August 1796) was a Danish nobleman and enfeoffed count. He was the fourth holder of the County of Schackenborg from 1741 to 1796.

Biography 

Hans Schack was born on 14 January 1734 at Schackenborg Castle in Møgeltønder in the Kingdom of Denmark. Born into the noble family of Schack, he was the fifth child and eldest surviving son of the Danish nobleman and civil servant Otto Didrik Schack, and his wife Anna Ernestine Frederikke Vilhelmine Gabel .

At the early death of his father on 11 July 1741, he inherited the County of Schackenborg and assumed the title of enfeoffed count.

Count Schack died on 21 August 1796, aged 62, at Schackenborg Castle. He was succeeded by his eldest surviving son, Otto Didrik Schack.

Family
Schack married firstly on 7 January 1757 at Christiansborg Palace Chapel in Copenhagen Ulrikke Augusta Vilhelmine Moltke, daughter of Danish courtier, statesman and diplomat Count Adam Gottlob Moltke and Christiane Frederikke von Brüggemann, by whom he had four children. She died on 7 April 1763 in Copenhagen.
 Otto Didrik Schack, who succeeded him as 5th Count of Schackenborg.
 Countess Frederikke Juliane Schack (1762–1815)
 Countess Anne Ernestine Schack (1762–1763)
 Countess Adamine Frederikke Schack (1763–1825)

Schack married secondly on 7 October 1763 at Lohma in the Duchy of Saxe-Altenburg Caroline Louise Sophie von Moltke, daughter of Joachim Christoph von Moltke and Sophia Albertina von Wolzogen), by whom he had four children. She died on 12 September 1794.
 Countess Caroline Mathilde Juliane Schack (1768–1775)
 stillborn son (1770)
 Countess Sophie Albertine Ernestine Schack (1772–1774)
 stillborn son (1775)

Notes and references

Bibliography

External links 
 Official website of Schackenborg Castle

1735 births
1796 deaths
18th-century Danish people
People from Tønder Municipality
Knights of the Order of the Dannebrog
Counts of Denmark